Arachalur Rock-cut Cave Musical Inscription, also known as Arachalur Isai Kalvettu is a rock cut historical site of musical inscriptions at the south of Nagamalai hill in Arachalur Reserve Forest near Erode in Tamil Nadu, India.

The Inscriptions
There are three 2nd century C.E. Jain inscriptions in Arachalur, which Dr. S. Raju  discovered. On a Jain bed in the Arachalur hills, is an inscription — ‘ezhuthum punaruthan maniya vannakkan devan sathan.’ The word ‘punaruthan’ is an alteration of punarthan, which means organised.
The other two inscriptions have musical syllables, which are the same when read from left to right, and vice versa; they are also the same when read from the top of a column to the bottom and vice versa. These two inscriptions show that 'Maniyan Vannakkan Devan Sathan' organised musical syllables. “This inscription, which belongs to the same period as Silappadikaram, is centuries older than the 'Kudumiyamalai inscriptions' on music, and yet the Arachalur inscription hardly draws visitors,” rues Dr.S. Raju.

Location
The site is located on the Erode-Palani State Highway-83A about 20 km from Erode Central Bus Terminus and 18 km from Erode Junction railway station.

References 

2nd-century inscriptions
Archaeological sites in Tamil Nadu
Jain rock-cut architecture
Erode district
Tourist attractions around Erode
Indian music history